Tanyard may refer to:

The yard of a tannery, see Tanning (leather)
Tanyard, Maryland, an unincorporated community
Tanyard Branch (disambiguation)
Tanyard Creek (disambiguation)